Mylothris aburi, the savanna dotted border, is a butterfly in the family Pieridae. It is found in eastern Senegal, Guinea, Ghana, Togo, and northern Nigeria. The habitat consists of the savanna-forest transition zone. It is also found in dry forests and light woodland.

It has been recorded amongst old Loranthus-infested citrus trees

References

Butterflies described in 2003
Pierini